Johan Jonasson (born 9 October 1966) is a Swedish gymnast. He competed at the 1984 Summer Olympics, the 1988 Summer Olympics and the 1992 Summer Olympics.

References

1966 births
Living people
Swedish male artistic gymnasts
Olympic gymnasts of Sweden
Gymnasts at the 1984 Summer Olympics
Gymnasts at the 1988 Summer Olympics
Gymnasts at the 1992 Summer Olympics
Sportspeople from Stockholm